Acantholipes semiaurea is a species of moth in the family Erebidae. It is found in Senegal.

References

semiaurea
Moths described in 1966
Moths of Africa